Nemanja Miljković (17 May 1990 – 10 December 2020) was a Serbian professional basketball player. He played power forward position.

Miljković died on 10 December 2020 after a long and severe illness.

References

External links
 Eurobasket Profile
 RealGM Profile
 ContractSports Profile

1990 births
2020 deaths
Serbian men's basketball players
Power forwards (basketball)
Aries Trikala B.C. players
KK Pärnu players
KK Vršac players
KK Zemun players
Serbian expatriate basketball people in Austria
Serbian expatriate basketball people in Estonia
Serbian expatriate basketball people in Greece
Serbian expatriate basketball people in Slovakia
Serbian expatriate basketball people in North Macedonia
Serbian expatriate basketball people in Qatar
Korvpalli Meistriliiga players
Sportspeople from Leskovac
Place of death missing